Uriel Frisch (born in Agen, in France, on December 10, 1940) is a French mathematical physicist known for his work on fluid dynamics and turbulence.

Biography
From 1959 to 1963 Frisch was a student at the École Normale Supérieure. Early in his graduate studies, he became interested in turbulence, under the mentorship of Robert Kraichnan, a former assistant to Albert Einstein. Frisch earned a Ph.D. in 1967 from the University of Paris, and since then he has worked at the French National Centre for Scientific Research (CNRS). He retired in 2006, and became a director of research emeritus at CNRS.

Frisch's wife Hélène is also a physicist, and the grand daughter of mathematician Paul Lévy.

Research
Frisch is the author of a 1995 book on turbulence and of over 200 research publications.

One of his most cited works, published in 1986, concerns the lattice gas automaton method of simulating fluid dynamics using a cellular automaton. The method used until that time, the HPP model, simulated particles moving in axis-parallel directions in a square lattice, but this model was unsatisfactory because it obeyed unwanted and unphysical conservation laws (the conservation of momentum within each axis-parallel line). Frisch and his co-authors Brosl Hasslacher and Yves Pomeau introduced a model using instead the hexagonal lattice which became known as the FHP model after the initials of its inventors and which much more accurately simulated the behavior of actual fluids.

Frisch is also known for his work with Giorgio Parisi  on the analysis of the fine structure of turbulent flows, for his early advocacy of multifractal systems in modeling physical processes, and for his research on using transportation theory to reconstruct the distribution of matter in the early universe.

Awards and honors
Frisch won the Peccot Prize of the Collège de France for his doctoral thesis in 1967, the Bazin Prize of the French Academy of Sciences in 1985, and the Lewis Fry Richardson Medal of the European Geosciences Union "for his fundamental contributions to the understanding of turbulence" in 2003.
He is a member of the French Academy of Sciences since 2008. He is an Officier of the Ordre national du Mérite and the recipient of the 2010 Modesto Panetti e Carlo Ferrari prize.
In 2020 he has been awarded with the prize EUROMECH, provided by the European Mechanics Society.

Selected publications
.

References

Further reading

External links
 
 Nice Uriel-fest, December 2010 (Photographs from a symposium in honor of Frisch)

Living people
École Normale Supérieure alumni
University of Paris alumni
Members of the French Academy of Sciences
French mathematicians
French physicists
Fluid dynamicists
Cellular automatists
Mathematical physicists
1940 births